= Sridhara (surname) =

Sridhara is an Indian name.
